Stenoglene bicolor is a moth in the family Eupterotidae. It was described by William Lucas Distant in 1897. It is found in South Africa.

References

Endemic moths of South Africa
Moths described in 1897
Janinae